
Gmina Wyśmierzyce is an urban-rural gmina (administrative district) in Białobrzegi County, Masovian Voivodeship, in east-central Poland.

Villages
Apart from the town of Wyśmierzyce, Gmina Wyśmierzyce contains the villages and settlements of Brodek, Górki, Grzmiąca, Jabłonna, Jeruzal, Kiedrzyn, Klamy, Korzeń, Kostrzyn, Kozłów, Kożuchów, Olszowe, Paprotno, Redlin, Romanów, Ulaski Grzmiąckie, Ulaski Stamirowskie, Witaszyn and Wólka Kożuchowska.

Neighbouring gminas
Gmina Wyśmierzyce is bordered by the gminas of Białobrzegi, Klwów, Mogielnica, Nowe Miasto nad Pilicą, Potworów, Promna and Radzanów.

References
Polish official population figures 2006

Wysmierzyce
Białobrzegi County